ALTO is an interbank network in Indonesia. It was founded in August 1993.

History

In 1997, Asian Economic Crisis invaded Indonesian banking industry. Many banks closed, merged or recapitalized.

In 2007, ALTO expanded the business to Money Transfer Operation. In 2009, ALTO developed Mobile Air Time Top Up for all telecommunication provider in Indonesia. The newest business start up from ALTO is Boston School of Banking and Finance, which focused in education for the future banking employers. The other start up is a payment service named ALTO Cash.

In November 2013, ALTO made a joint venture with Seven Bank, who is a Japanese ATM network, named PT. ATM. The goal is to developing ATM business in Indonesia.

Timeline
 1994 – Shared ATM Network
 2004 – ATM Acquiring
 2007 – Money Transfer Operation
 2009 – Biller, Top Up Mobile
 2011 – Front End Processing Switching Outsourcing
 2011 – NSICCS Function Lab 2012
 2011 – Core Banking Outsourcing
 2011 – Alto Cash and ARMS (Mobile Wallet)
 2011 – Boston School of Banking and Finance
 2012 – SMS Banking
 2013 – Tanamas System
 2013 – EDC
 2013 - Set Up PT CBI with PT RINTIS and PT ARTAJASA
 2013 – Remittance Outward
 2014 – Alto Pay
 2015 - PCI-DSS Compliant (Coming Soon)

Products
 Outsourcing Core Banking Application
 Outsourcing Switching Application
 ATM Outsourcing
 ALTO Cash
 Biller Gateway 
 Remittance (Cash to Account or Account to Cash)§→§

Definition of Member, Partner, and Merchant in ALTO Network
 The members in ALTO Network are every financial institution or bank which registered as member in ALTO Network. The membership is open for all Bank Indonesia clearing participant.
 The partners in ALTO Network are every companies which provide biller service and delivery channel service owner.
 The merchants in ALTO Network are every business entity or individual which participated in Debt Card Service Facility utilization and incorporated in ALTO Network.

Members
 Bank Permata, 
 Bank Internasional Indonesia, 
 Bank Danamon, 
 Bank Panin, 
 Bank Artha Graha, 
 Bank Prima Master
 Bank BNP
 Bank Harda International,
 Citibank Indonesia
 Sinarmas Bank
 Bank Kesejahteraan Ekonomi
 BPR KS
 Bank Negara Indonesia
 Bank Tabungan Negara
 Bank CNB
 DBS Bank
 BPR Eka Bumi Artha
 Bank SBI Indonesia
 BPR Lasem

Non Bank Member
 KSP Intidana
 PT. Finnet Indonesia (subsidiary of Telkom Indonesia)
 PT. Indosat Tbk. (known as Indosat-Ooredoo)

References
 Yellow Pages Indonesia 
 (Indonesian) CBI Siapkan Sertifikasi Kartu ATM Debet Berbasis Chip

Financial services companies of Indonesia
Interbank networks